Sexuality & Culture is a quarterly peer-reviewed academic journal covering ethical, cultural, psychological, social, and political issues related to sexual relationships and sexual behavior. The journal was established in 1997 by Barry Dank and Roberto Refinetti and published by Transaction Publishers. It is currently published by Springer Science+Business Media. The editor-in-chief is Roberto Refinetti (Boise State University).

Abstracting and indexing
The journal is abstracted and indexed in:

References

External links

English-language journals
Sexology journals
Publications established in 1997
Springer Science+Business Media academic journals